The 1965–66 Coppa Italia, the 19th Coppa Italia, was an Italian Football Federation domestic cup competition won by Fiorentina.

First round 

* Potenza, Palermo and Venezia qualify after drawing of lots.

Intermediate round 

* Potenza qualify after drawing of lots.

Second round

Third round 

p=after penalty shoot–out

The result of the match Varese–Vicenza was declared void.

Repeat third round match

Quarter–finals 
Milan, Torino, Internazionale and Juventus are added.

p=after penalty shoot–out

Semi–finals

Final

Top goalscorers

References

Coppa Italia seasons
Coppa Italia, 1965–66
1965–66 domestic association football cups